ITV Weather is the national and regional forecast shown on UK terrestrial network ITV, and is provided by the Met Office (except the Channel Islands forecast, which is provided by the Jersey Meteorological Department). Bulletins are usually broadcast after every ITV News and ITV regional bulletin, although during ITV News at 6.30pm national weather is broadcast live from the news studio. Emma Jesson is the longest serving forecaster after 30 years with ITV Weather.

National weather
The national bulletin launched on the ITV network on 13 February 1989, complimenting the previous regional arrangements whereby the separate ITV  regional licence holders were responsible for providing weather forecasts themselves only for their regional franchise areas.

National weather sponsors
The national weather for ITV and STV has had commercial sponsors from the outset, as listed in the chart below. ITV Weather on Good Morning Britain and its predecessors have always had a different sponsorship deal.

Regional weather
Each region has at least one dedicated presenter.
At weekends three presenters cover all of the 15 sub-regions and one presenter covers the national forecast. Currently the weekend hubs are grouped and recorded from the following: 
Calendar (North/South opts), Granada Reports, ITV News Tyne Tees and Lookaround. 
MediaCityUK in Salford, Greater Manchester.
ITV News Anglia (East/West opts), ITV News Central (East/West opts), ITV News London and ITV News Cymru Wales.
Millbank Studios in Millbank, central London.
ITV News Channel TV, ITV News Meridian (East/West opts) and ITV News West Country (West/South West opts)
Whiteley, Hampshire.
UTV Live
 MediaCityUK in Salford, Greater Manchester.
STV News
Has a dedicated weekend presenter.

Regional weather sponsors
As with the National ITV Weather, the regional weather forecasts for ITV licence holders have commercial sponsors. These are currently:

Graphics
On 3 October 2016, new graphics were introduced on the National ITV Weather and across all ITV plc-owned regions. These graphics are also used on Good Morning Britain in their weather updates as well as regional news. STV introduced their own new graphics earlier in 2016.

On-air staff

References

External links
National Weather at itv.com
Anglia Weather at itv.com
Border Weather at itv.com
Calendar Weather at itv.com
Channel Weather at itv.com
Central Weather at itv.com
Granada Weather at itv.com
London Weather at itv.com
Meridian Weather at itv.com
Tyne Tees Weather at itv.com
UTV Weather at itv.com
Wales Weather at itv.com
West Country Weather at itv.com
STV Weather at stv.tv

1989 in British television
ITV (TV network)
 
Television news in the United Kingdom
Weather television